Berwald is a surname. Notable people with the surname include:

 Franz Berwald (1796–1868), Swedish Romantic composer
 Johan Fredrik Berwald (1787–1861), Swedish violinist, conductor and composer
 Juli Berwald, American biologist and writer
 Julie Berwald (1822–1877), Swedish concert and opera singer
 Mathilda Berwald (1798–1877), Finnish/Swedish concert singer
 William Berwald (1864–1948), American composer and conductor

See also 
 10380 Berwald, main-belt asteroid
 Bärwald
 Bärwalde
 Baerwald